Curtis Huppe (born February 21, 1979) is a  Canadian former ice hockey forward.

Career 
Born in Winnipeg, Manitoba, Huppe began his junior career in the Western Hockey League for the Medicine Hat Tigers, Lethbridge Hurricanes and the Tri-City Americans. After a brief spell in the United Hockey League for the Muskegon Fury during their playoff run, Huppe spent the next four seasons in the East Coast Hockey League, where he played for Greenville Grrrowl, Greensboro Generals, Jackson Bandits, Arkansas RiverBlades, Cincinnati Cyclones and the South Carolina Stingrays.

In 2004, Huppe joined the Belfast Giants and quickly became a huge fan favourite at the Odyssey Arena. He represented the Giants for three seasons, helping the side to the Elite League Championship in 2005/06 playing on the giants most successful line with Theo Fleury and Ed Courtenay.

Huppe finished his stint with the Belfast Giants in 2007.

On June 12, 2007, he was announced as having signed for the Coventry Blaze.

On March 9, 2008, Coventry Blaze retained the Elite League Championship, with Huppe scoring the Championship winning goal against the Belfast Giants. Huppe finished the 2008 Elite League season with an impressive 74 points in 58 games, his most productive year to date.

On April 24, 2008, Huppe announced his retirement from Hockey, but was tempted out of retirement by former Coventry Blaze colleague Sylvain Cloutier in December 2008 and went on to play in the CHL for Corpus Christi Icerayz where he played for a couple of months. On April 29, 2009, Huppe signed a contract with the Hull Stingrays as player assistant coach, marking a return to the Elite League and re-uniting him with Cloutier who is now the Head-coach of the Stingrays. it was at the end of this season Huppe decided not to remain with the club and gave his notice for the 2nd year of his 2-year contract and was then signed up by Manchester Phoenix in the English Premier League where he accumulated 61 goals and 54 assists and won another league championship.

On May 16, 2011, Huppe was announced as signing for Guildford Flames Ice Hockey Club who were 2010-11 English Premier League Playoff Winners. It was here Huppe won another league championship in the 11/12 season and again in the 12/13 season.
Huppe finally parted ways with the Guildford Flames in November 2014 after returning from injury and signed for the rest of the season with his former team the Belfast Giants playing his first game against Braehead on 28 December 2014. On January 30, 2015, he was released from his contract by the Belfast Giants to return to Milton Keynes.

Career statistics

References

External links

1979 births
Arkansas RiverBlades players
Belfast Giants players
Canadian ice hockey right wingers
Cincinnati Cyclones (ECHL) players
Corpus Christi Icerays players
Coventry Blaze players
Greensboro Generals players
Greenville Grrrowl players
Guildford Flames players
Hull Stingrays players
Jackson Bandits players
Lethbridge Hurricanes players
Manchester Phoenix players
Medicine Hat Tigers players
Muskegon Fury players
Ice hockey people from Winnipeg
South Carolina Stingrays players
Tri-City Americans players
Living people
Canadian expatriate ice hockey players in England
Canadian expatriate ice hockey players in the United States
Canadian expatriate ice hockey players in Northern Ireland